Bellignat station (French: Gare de Bellignat) is a French railway station located in the commune of Bellignat, Ain department in the Auvergne-Rhône-Alpes region. It is located at kilometric point (KP) 106.818 on the Andelot-en-Montagne—La Cluse railway.

As of 2020, the station is owned and operated by the SNCF and served by TER Auvergne-Rhône-Alpes trains.

History 
On 14 August 1892, the municipal council of Bellignat voted to ask for the existing railway halt in the commune to opened to cargo merchants.

In 2019, the SNCF estimated that 5,373 passengers traveled through the station.

Services

Passenger services 
Classified as a PANG (point d'accès non géré), the station is unstaffed without any passenger services.

Train services 
As of 2020, the station is served by TER Auvergne-Rhône-Alpes line 31 trains between Lyon and Oyonnax.

Intermodality 
In addition to passenger vehicle parking, the station is equipped with storage racks and facilities for bicycles.

The station is also served by replacement and supplementary TER bus service from the nearby lycée.

See also 

 List of SNCF stations in Auvergne-Rhône-Alpes

References 

Railway stations in Ain